The 1st Severia Tank Brigade is an armored formation of the Ukrainian Ground Forces. The brigade is garrisoned in Honcharivske.

History
The brigade was formed from the 292nd Guards Armored Novohrad Orders of the Red Banner, Kutuzov, Bogdan Khmelnitsky, Alexander Nevsky and Red Star Regiment of the 72nd Mechanized Division and 280th Armored Regiment of the 25th Mechanized Division. Following the Soviet Union's dissolution, the unit fell under Ukraine's banner. Ukraine's army reconstituted the brigade in September 2014, following the Annexation of Crimea by the Russian Federation.

Russo-Ukrainian War
In January 2015, elements of the brigade were reported to have participated in the Second Battle of Donetsk Airport to attempt a breakthrough. Then on 18 November 2015, the Soviet decorations included in the brigade's full name (1st Separate Guards Tank Novohrad Orders of the Red Banner, Kutuzov, Bogdan Khmelnitsky, Alexander Nevsky and Red Star Brigade, were removed under Ukrainian decommunization law, leaving the name to be 1st Guards Tank Brigade. Furthermore, on 22 August 2016, its Guards title was also removed. It was granted the Siverska honorific on 24 August 2017.  As of April 2021, the brigade was seen fighting in Donbas until Russia began massing troops along Ukraine's border, moving back to its original garrison outside of Kyiv.

At the onset of the 2022 Russian invasion of Ukraine, the brigade's elements dispersed in anticipation of the imminent barrage of artillery, rockets, and airstrikes in the opening hours. Following the bombardment, the unit returned to Chernihiv to respond to Russian vanguard forces from the 41st Combined Arms Army which consisted of a number of meeting engagements in the surrounding forests. Russian forces made attempts to take the city on the road to Kyiv but were repelled; they eventually bypassed the city. The brigade, augmented by Territorial Defense Forces and reserves, remained in Chernihiv while Russian reinforcements began to encircle the city as a result of more failed assault. This resulted in the Siege of Chernihiv. Despite encirclement, the brigade maintained one supply route for communications and resupply. By 31 March 2022, the brigade had successfully defended the city against Russian attacks and the siege was lifted. Surviving elements of the Russian 41st CAA retreated north to Belarus. The brigade recaptured surrounding Ukrainian towns and the M01 Highway connecting to Kyiv. 

Following, the brigade was deployed to the north of the Donbas before conducting rest and refit in May. By July, elements of the brigade were deployed back to the Battle of Donbas in the area of southern Donetsk and Kramatorsk. The unit was given the recently established honorary award of "For Courage and Bravery" by Ukrainian President Volodymyr Zelenskyy for its service in Chernihiv, the southern counteroffensive, and the Donbas region. He went further stating "in six months, more than a thousand warriors of this brigade were awarded state awards."

Current structure 
As of 2017 the brigade's structure is as follows:
 1st Tank Brigade, Honcharivske
 Headquarters & Headquarters Company
 1st Tank Battalion
 2nd Tank Battalion
 3rd Tank Battalion
 Brigade Artillery Group
 Headquarters & Target Acquisition Battery
 Self-propelled Artillery Battalion (2S3 Akatsiya)
 Self-propelled Artillery Battalion (2S1 Gvozdika)
 Rocket Artillery Battalion (BM-21 Grad)
 Anti-Aircraft Missile Artillery Battalion
 Engineer Battalion
 Maintenance Battalion
 Logistic Battalion
 Reconnaissance Company
 Sniper Company
 Electronic Warfare Company
 Signal Company
 Radar Company
 CBRN-defense Company
 Medical Company

Awards
Historical Honors:
 1945 received the Guards designation. – removed
 ??? received the Order of the Red Star – removed
 ??? received the Order of the Red Banner – removed
 ??? received the Order of Alexander Nevsky – removed
 ??? received the Order of Kutuzov – removed
 ??? received the Order of Bogdan Khmelnitsky – removed
Current Honors of the Brigade:
 2017 received: Siverska designation
 2022 received: "For Courage and Bravery"

Insignia

References

Brigades of the Ukrainian Ground Forces
Armoured brigades of Ukraine
Military units and formations established in 1942
Military units and formations of Ukraine in the war in Donbas
1942 establishments in the Soviet Union
Military units and formations of the 2022 Russian invasion of Ukraine